Micraspis lineola is a species of ladybird. It was described by Johan Christian Fabricius in 1775.

References

External links
 Micraspis lineola at the Atlas of Living Australia

Coccinellidae
Beetles described in 1775
Taxa named by Johan Christian Fabricius